George F. Knight was an American football guard who played one season for the Chicago Cardinals of the National Football League. He attended Loyola University.

References

1898 births
Date of birth unknown
Year of death unknown
American football guards
Loyola Ramblers football players
Chicago Cardinals players